The 2015 Fiji National Football League was the 39th season of the Fiji National Football League organized by the Fiji Football Association since its establishment in 1977.

Standings

References

Fiji Premier League seasons
Fiji
National Football League